Kulasekhara (sometimes in Tamil and Malayalam: Kulachekara) is a South Asian male name, used as both given and last name, prevalent in south India (Tamil Nadu and Kerala) and Sri Lanka. 

Medieval Chera kings of Kerala, was formerly referred by historians as Kulasekharas. It was assumed that the all medieval Chera kings of Kerala bore the abhishekanama 'Kulasekhara'. It is now known that the kings did not bear the specific abhishekanama 'Kulasekhara'.

People with name Kulasekhara 

 Nuwan Kulasekara, Sri Lankan cricketer (born 1982)

Historical 
Several Pandya royals with the 'regnal name' Kulasekhara are known to scholars.

Jatavarma Kulasekara I (fl. late 12th century AD)
Maravarma Kulasekara I (fl. 13th century AD)

Two medieval Chera kings of Kerala, with the name 'Kulasekhara' are known from epigraphy.

 Sthanu Ravi Kulasekhara or Kulasekhara the Alvar or Kulasekhara Varma (fl. 9th century AD)
 Rama Kulasekhara (fl. late 11th century AD)

Dynasties with name Kulasekhara 

 Ruling lineage of the kingdom of Venad - Kulasekhara dynasty.
In the modern period the rulers of Travancore were also known as the Kulasekharas.

References

See also
Kula Shaker, a British rock band inspired by Kulasekhara Alvar

Indian masculine given names